Krishan Dhawan  (1926 - 20 May 1994  was an Indian character actor in Hindi language films.

Career
Krishan Dhawan was an actor, known for Vidhaata (1982), Mujhe Jeene Do (1963) and Roti Kapada Aur Makaan (1974).

Personal life
He is the father of actor Dilip Dhawan who acted in the iconic television serial "Nukkad" portraying the role of the mechanic "Guru".

Filmography

References

External links
 

20th-century Indian male actors
Male actors from Mumbai
Male actors in Hindi cinema